Rock Region Metropolitan Transit Authority (also known as Rock Region Metro, stylized as Rock Region METRO), is the largest transit agency in Arkansas. It was formerly known as the Central Arkansas Transit Authority. Rock Region Metro provides public transportation services within Pulaski County, Arkansas, seven days a week.

The system has 25 bus routes, including four express commuter routes. A demand response ADA paratransit service, known as LINKS, operates alongside the fixed route hours and coverage area. A heritage streetcar system, known as the Metro Streetcar, operates 3.4 miles of track throughout the downtown areas of Little Rock and North Little Rock.

Background

Prior to the creation of the former Central Arkansas Transit Authority, the transit system was owned and operated by private companies. Until 1950, the transit system was owned by Arkansas Power & Light (AP&L), the predecessor to Entergy Arkansas. In 1950, AP&L sold the transit system, then known as Capital Transportation Company (CTC), to a group of local investors. A strike by the transit union, Amalgamated Transit Union Division 704, in 1955-1956 left the company with a damaged reputation and exacerbated existing financial problems.

The governments of Little Rock and North Little Rock awarded the franchise to a new company, Citizens' Coach Company (CCC), on February 28, 1956. Although the new company was backed by a group of local unions, the same financial problems that CTC encountered led to the demise of CCC by 1962. The declining passenger revenue and rising wages left few resources to maintain the bus fleet.

Following the takeover of the transit system by Twin City Transit (TCT) on September 25, 1962, the federal government began offering funds to struggling transit systems through various assistance programs. This funding assisted TCT with purchasing new buses, and TCT experienced some financial success. But the increase in passenger revenue was temporary, as TCT could not keep up with offering service in the expanding cities without continuing to receive fare increases. A 1971 study recommended that the transit system shift to public ownership under the direction of a regional authority.

Central Arkansas Transit commenced operations under the trusteeship of the metropolitan planning organization Metroplan on May 1, 1972. As a regional planning entity, Metroplan lacked the resources to supervise a transit operation indefinitely. Local government partners were being asked to infuse more money into the operation, and wanted more of a direct say than the 1972 agreement granted. On July 14, 1986, CATA was chartered when the government of Pulaski County and the city governments of Little Rock, North Little Rock, Cammack Village, Maumelle, Sherwood, and Jacksonville entered into an interlocal agreement that established CATA as a public corporation. (Cammack Village eventually ceased participation in CATA, eliminating funds beginning with its 2006 budget.) On August 12, 2015, the Central Arkansas Transit Authority was officially rebranded as Rock Region Metro.

Bus Routes

Streetcars

Metro Streetcar began operation in November 2004, as the River Rail Streetcar.  (It was given its current name in 2015.)  Operating 3.4 miles of track in Little Rock and across the Arkansas River in North Little Rock, the streetcar system caters to visitors, tourists, and local downtown residents.  CATA conducted its River Rail Economic Enhancement Study in late 2012, noting resulting improvements in four areas: significant capital investment along the streetcar line, increased sales and property tax revenue, increased population of downtown neighborhood residents, and increased visitor volume and tourism for the streetcar and local attractions..

River Cities Travel Center
River Cities Travel Center (RCTC) opened on August 28, 2000, to serve as the main transfer hub in downtown Little Rock. As of January 2016, a total of 22 fixed routes and all four express routes serve RCTC, which doubles as the agency's primary sales and information office for riders. At the Midtown Target stop in central Little Rock, five fixed routes (#3, #5, #8, #9, and #22) converge on Midtown Avenue to provide more convenient, efficient transferring opportunities in west-central Little Rock.

Microtransit
Rock Region METRO operates on-demand ride hailing services through its Transloc App. It expanded service to Conway, Arkansas on October 24th, 2022, marking the city's first modern-day public transit service.

Current Fleet
All busses use Gillig Corporation as their make & Low Floor as their model.

Bus

Paratransit
All busses use ElDorado National as their make.

Rail
All cars are manufactured by Gomaco Trolley Company as their make & Replica Birney as their model.

Future
Rock Region Metro is involved in the long-range transportation planning process for the Little Rock metropolitan area known as MOVE Central Arkansas. Future expansion recommendations include more frequent service, expanded coverage area, service to outlying areas, Sunday service on all routes, and placement of facilities at more bus stops.

There are expansion studies for the Metro Streetcar to provide more service in North Little Rock and Little Rock. Recommendations include service to the Arkansas State Capitol, Clinton National Airport, and Main Street extensions in both downtown Little Rock and North Little Rock's Mid-City neighborhood.

External links

Official Site
System Map
Downtown Map & Bus Service Info

References 

 http://www.cat.org/wp-content/uploads/2013/05/METRO-2030.2.pdf
Patty, William Jordan. "Little Rock public transit in postwar America, 1950-1972" (2003)

 
Intermodal transportation authorities in Arkansas
Bus transportation in Arkansas
Transportation in Little Rock, Arkansas
Paratransit services in the United States
Transit agencies in Arkansas
1986 establishments in Arkansas